Mastyugino is a rural locality (a selo) and the administrative center of Mastyuginskoye Rural Settlement, Ostrogozhsky District, Voronezh Oblast, Russia. The population was 657 as of 2010. There are 6 streets.

Geography 
Mastyugino is located 47 km north of Ostrogozhsk (the district's administrative centre) by road. Novo-Uspenka is the nearest rural locality.

References 

Rural localities in Ostrogozhsky District
Korotoyaksky Uyezd